Reid Bluff is a bluff rising to 2040 m, at the head of Donnally Glacier, Churchill Mountains. Named in honor of B. E. Reid, a member of the 1959 Cape Hallett winter-over team, working as a biologist on the geomagnetic project.
 

Cliffs of Oates Land